Avižlys is a river of  Akmenė district municipality, Šiauliai County, northern Lithuania. It flows for 20 kilometres and has a basin area of 78 km2.

The Avižlys flows into the Venta River.

See also
Uogys, another left-bank tributary of the Venta which runs close by and almost parallel

References

Rivers of Lithuania
Venta River basin
Akmenė District Municipality